Deltan may refer to:

 Deltan Dallagnol, a Brazilian jurist and politician
 Deltans, as referring to people from Delta State, a subdivision of Nigeria
 Deltans, a fictional alien race in the Star Trek franchise